is the third facility in Japan for interconnecting the power grid of eastern Japan, which operates at 50 hertz, and that of western Japan, which operates at 60 hertz.

The Higashi-Shimizu Frequency Converter Station is operated by Chubu Electric Power Co. and is located at 677-3 Tanakake, Hirose-aza, Shimizu-ku, Shizuoka. It is fed via a 275 kV power line and a 154 kV power line. Its inverters operate at 125 kVDC and have a maximum transmission rate of 300 MW.

Japan's other converter stations are at Shin-Shinano in Nagano Prefecture, Sakuma Dam in Shizuoka Prefecture, and Minami-Fukumitsu in Toyama Prefecture.

See also
 Electricity sector in Japan#Transmission
 Energy in Japan

External links 

 http://www.chuden.co.jp/english/corporate/press2005/0323_1.html

Converter stations
Electric power infrastructure in Japan
Chubu Electric Power
Energy infrastructure completed in 2003
Buildings and structures in Shizuoka (city)